Hindringham Meadows is a   Local Nature Reserve near Hindringham, north of Fakenham in Norfolk. It is owned and managed by North Norfolk District Council.

The site is accessed from a road to its north.

References

Local Nature Reserves in Norfolk